Bushranger (1930–1937) was an American Thoroughbred steeplechase racehorse. Prepared for flat racing, at age two the grandson of Man o' War demonstrated little ability in that venue and as such his owner decided to try him in steeplechase racing. In the hands of future Hall of Fame steeplechase trainer J. Howard Lewis, Bushranger won important races at age five and six including the American Grand National, the most prestigious steeplechase race in the United States.

Bushranger was retired after his six-year-old racing season but the following year he fractured a leg during a schooling exercise at Belmont Park and had to be euthanized.

References
 Bushranger's pedigree and racing stats
 Bushranger at the United States' National Museum of Racing and Hall of Fame

1930 racehorse births
1937 racehorse deaths
Thoroughbred family 23-a
Racehorses bred in Kentucky
Racehorses trained in the United States
American steeplechase racehorses
United States Thoroughbred Racing Hall of Fame inductees